Katarina Srebotnik and Ai Sugiyama were the defending champions, but Sugiyama retired from the sport on October 2, 2009, and only Srebotnik competed that year. Srebotnik partnered with Anna-Lena Grönefeld, and they won in the final 6-1, 6-4 against Klaudia Jans and Alicja Rosolska.

Seeds

Draw

Finals

External links
 Main Draw

Generali Ladies Linz